Stars in the House is a daily live streamed web series created and hosted by Seth Rudetsky and his husband James Wesley to support The Actors Fund and its services. Created in the wake of the COVID-19 pandemic in the United States, Stars in the House debuted in March 2020.

Stars in the House is a combination of music, community, and education (from CBS Chief Medical correspondent Dr. Jon LaPook). Originally airing twice daily (at Broadway showtimes, 2 PM and 8 PM), it now streams daily at 8 PM ET across multiple platforms, including YouTube. The show features musical performances by stars remotely from their home and conversations with Seth and James between each tune. Viewers can also donate to the charity and interact with guests in real time. Stars in the House raised over $50,000 in the first four days of airing and plans to stream daily until Broadway re-opens. They have raised a total of $1,074,395 as of September 12, 2021.

As of March 8, 2021, they have also raised $203,337 for other 501c3s including The Trevor Project, You Gotta Believe, NAACP Legal Defense Fund, Cats4CovidRelief, Broadway at CBST, Greater Orlando Performing Arts Relief, Cancer Support Community, New York Gay Men's Chorus, Youth Pride Chorus, Tonewall, Bullets to Books, and Waterkeeper Alliance.

Development 
On March 12, 2020, New York Governor Andrew M. Cuomo and New York City Mayor Bill de Blasio enacted new restrictions to try to stop the spread of the Coronavirus, which at the time had already infected nearly 100 people. One of the restrictions was banning most gatherings of more than 500 people, which included all Broadway theaters. Quickly after, states like California and Illinois enacted similar guidelines. With thousands of actors instantly out of work and stuck at home, Rudetsky and Wesley came up with the idea as a way to both raise spirits and help those suffering.

The first show aired on Monday, March 16, with Tony Award winner Kelli O'Hara.

Episodes 
A complete list of archived episodes is available on The Actor's Fund's YouTube channel.

Segments

"Plays in the House" 
Plays in the House are special episodes of Stars in the House, one-night only live readings of plays featuring the original performers. Plays in the House streams every Wednesday and Saturday at 2pm EST, Broadway's standard matinee time.

Television cast reunions

Film cast reunions

Musical cast reunions

Broadway Memorabilia Auction 
In addition to direct donations made to The Actor's Fund, viewers can also contribute by bidding on memorabilia donated directly from the stars themselves. Items have included Tina Fey's old headshot, Betty Buckley's original wig from Cats, and a gown worn by Kristin Chenoweth.

External links 

 Stars in the House on IMDb
 Stars in the House on YouTube

References 

2020 web series debuts
Broadway theatre
Impact of the COVID-19 pandemic on the performing arts
Cultural responses to the COVID-19 pandemic